The 24 Manai Telugu Chettiars (24MTC) is a South Indian caste. They can speak Tamil and Telugu and are found predominantly in the states of Tamil Nadu, Kerala, Andhra Pradesh, Karnataka in India, as well as Gujarat and Sri Lanka.

Etymology and history 
The title word Chettiar/Shetty is used by many merchant and trading groups who were classified as high ranking 'Vaishyas' and sometimes they claim Vaishyas status  in the south-indian states.

The 24 Manai Telugu Chettiar people were migrated into Tamil Nadu from Andhra Pradesh during Vijayanagar empire period. After the migration into tamilnadu, they underwent various cultural diversities, met difficulties in the patterns of linguistic assimilation, adjustment and other adaptive processes. Bilingualism (Telugu and Tamil) was found tedious among the immigrant households (successive generation children). Most of them failed to speak Telugu language at home and gained proficiency in Tamil.

Titles 
This community is known by a number of variants and spellings of their name, and is divided into twenty-four subdivisions (manai). This community is also known by different names and spelling variants. They may be called "Sadhu Chetty", "Telugu chettiar", "Telugu chetty", "24 Mane telugu shetty" and "Telungapatty chetty". Also referred as yaga Kshatriya.

Gothras 
16 Veedu Gothiram : Mummudiar, Chennaiyor, Kavalavar, Vammaiyor, Kanithiyavar, Thillaiyavar, Paliviriyar, Kandhavangaravar, Maratiyavar, Kappavar, Thariyavar, Wajyavar, Kanthiyavar, Naliviriyavar, Suragayor, Kolayavar.

8 Veedu Gothiram : Mathalaiyavar, Thavalaiyavar, Koragayar, Soppiyavar, Rajabairavar, Makkadaiyar, Pillivangaravar, Pasupathiyar Pachaiyar, Iratayavar.

See also 
 Chettiar
 https://www.usa24mtc.org/
 https://m.youtube.com/watch?v=NfGBYBHkhI8

References

Chettiar
Social groups of Gujarat
Social groups of Tamil Nadu
Indian castes